Rewrite and rewriting may refer to:

Script doctoring, revisions to an existing script for stage and screen productions
Rewriting, methods for replacing elements of a formula with other suitable expressions, in mathematics, computer science, and logic, such as:
Graph rewriting, technique of creating a new graph out of an original graph algorithmically
Sender Rewriting Scheme, a scheme for rewriting the envelope sender address of an email message
String rewriting, a rewriting system over strings from an alphabet
Rewrite (programming), the act or result of writing new source code to replace an existing computer program
Rewrite man, a journalist that crafts stories based on information reported by others
"Rewrite" (song), 2004 single by Asian Kung-Fu Generation
Rewrite (visual novel), a 2011 Japanese visual novel by Key
The Rewrite, a 2014 American romantic comedy film

See also
Tax Law Rewrite Project, a major effort to re-write the entire tax legislation of the United Kingdom
Blackwhite, or Rewriting the past, according to George Orwell's 1984
Rewrite engine, webserver component that performs rewriting on URLs
Rewrite history, the re-interpretation of a historical account